Your Hero Is Not Dead is the debut studio album by English musician Westerman. It was released on 5 June 2020 under Partisan Records in the US and PIAS Recordings in the Europe.

Singles
The first single to be released from the album, "Blue Comanche" was announced on 17 January 2020. The second single "Think I'll Stay" was announced on 11 March 2020, along with the announcement of the album. The third single to be released from album "Waiting on Design" was released on 8 April 2020. The fourth single, the same name as the album, was announced 21 April 2020. On 7 May 2020, Westerman released the fifth single "The Line".

Critical reception
Your Hero Is Not Dead was met with "generally favorable" reviews from critics. At Metacritic, which assigns a weighted average rating out of 100 to reviews from mainstream publications, the album received an average score of 78, based on 10 reviews. Aggregator Album of the Year gave the album 76 out of 100 based on a critical consensus of 15 reviews. At AnyDecentMusic?, the release received 7.7 out of 10.

Track listing

Release history

References

2020 debut albums
Experimental pop albums
PIAS Recordings albums
Partisan Records albums